The North Dakota State Library is a government operated library in the U.S. state of North Dakota. Located in the state's capital city of Bismarck on the capital grounds, the library has been in operation since 1907. The State Library is a division of  the North Dakota Department of Public Instruction.

History
The State Library was established as the Public Library Commission in 1907, and it occupied a single room in the North Dakota State Capitol building. In 1909, the library's name was changed to the State Library Commission. In 1936, the library moved to the Liberty Memorial Building on the Capitol Grounds, which is where it remained until 1970. At that point, the library moved this time to the Randal Building north of the city. The agency's name was changed to the North Dakota State Library in 1979, which is still its name today. In 1982, the State Library returned to the Liberty Memorial Building, its present location.

State Librarians

Mary J. Soucie, 2014-current
Hulen E. Bivins, 2010-2013
Doris A. Ott, 2001-2010
Joseph C. Linnertz (acting director), 2000-2001
Mike Jaugstetter, 1996-2000
Joseph C. Linnertz (acting director), 1995-1996
William R. Strader, 1991-1993
Patricia L. Harris, 1985-1991
Margaret M. Stefanak, 1983-1985
Ruth E. Mahan, 1981-1983
Richard J. Wolfert, 1969-1981
Leone Morrison (acting director), 1968-1969
Freda W. Hatten, 1964-1968
Hazel Webster Byrnes, 1948-1964
Lillian E. Cook, 1922-1948
Mary E. Downey, 1921-1923
S. Blanche Hedrick, 1919-1921
Minnie Clarke Budlong, 1909-1919
Zana K. Miller, 1907-1908

Function
The State Library specializes in information services to state agencies and to the general public.

Departments

The North Dakota State Library has four divisions: Administrative Services, Technology Services, Patron Services, and Library Services. The departments under these divisions include: Administration, Cataloging, Circulation, Digital Initiatives, Information Technology, Interlibrary Loan, Library Development, Public Information, Reference, and Talking Books.

Publications

North Dakota State Library staff produce publications on Library Vision, State Library services, handbooks for North Dakota public library board members, copyright, interlibrary loan, North Dakota library law, search warrants, and North Dakota public library statistics.  These publications include:
Brochures
Flyers
Handbooks & Manuals
Library Directories
Reports

References

External links
Official website
Media contributed by North Dakota State Library (Wikimedia Commons)

1907 establishments in North Dakota
Buildings and structures in Bismarck, North Dakota
Education in Burleigh County, North Dakota
Government agencies established in 1907
Government of North Dakota
Libraries in North Dakota
North Dakota
Federal depository libraries